Prudence Ann Car  (née Guillaume) is an Australian politician. She has served as the Labor member for Londonderry in the New South Wales Legislative Assembly since 2015. She is currently the Deputy Leader of the NSW Opposition, Shadow Minister for Education and Shadow Minister for Early Childhood Learning in the NSW Shadow Cabinet.

Career
Car was a Penrith City Councillor and national communications manager at MS Australia when she was elected. She had previously been an advisor to Premier Bob Carr from 2003 to 2005 and campaign co-ordinator of the Labor Party from 2005 to 2007.

Car was elected to the New South Wales Legislative Assembly as member for Londonderry at the 2015 New South Wales state election. Less than a year later, in 2016, Car was appointed as Shadow Minister for Skills and Shadow Assistant Minister for Education in the Shadow Ministry of Luke Foley. In 2018, she was appointed Shadow Minister for TAFE and Skills and Shadow Minister for Western Sydney in the Shadow Ministry of Michael Daley.

Car was re-elected as member for Londonderry at the 2019 election and was appointed to replace Jihad Dib as Shadow Minister for Education in the Shadow Ministry of Jodi McKay.

On 8 June 2021, Car was elected as deputy leader of the party and deputy leader of the opposition. She retained the Education portfolio and was also appointed as Shadow Minister for Early Childhood Learning in the Shadow Ministry of Chris Minns.

Personal life 
Car was born and raised in Western Sydney.  She has Indian and French heritage with a grandfather who was French and her father from Durgapur, West Bengal, India. Car is married with one son. In 2022, she took leave from parliament to undergo treatment for kidney cancer.

References

Living people
Australian Labor Party members of the Parliament of New South Wales
Members of the New South Wales Legislative Assembly
New South Wales local councillors
Australian people of Indian descent
Australian people of French descent
Year of birth missing (living people)
Place of birth missing (living people)
21st-century Australian politicians
Women members of the New South Wales Legislative Assembly
Women local councillors in Australia
21st-century Australian women politicians